Parapolydora is a genus of flowering plants belonging to the family Asteraceae.

Its native range is Southern Tropical and Southern Africa.

Species
Species:

Parapolydora fastigiata 
Parapolydora gerrardii

References

Asteraceae
Asteraceae genera